The Super Heroines were an American deathrock trio formed in Los Angeles, California, during the early 1980s. However, unlike other early deathrock bands such as Christian Death and 45 Grave, Super Heroines did not carry on a traditional goth sound, instead a more punk style metal inspired by the Runaways.

Its original lineup featured Eva O (guitar and vocals), Sandra Ross (bass), and Del Mar Richardson (drums). Other members of the group have included bassists Jill Emery and Edwin Borsheim as well as drummers Steve Darrow, China Figueroa and Cathy Falanga.

Both Jill Emery and Eva O went on to play with Rozz Williams (from fellow deathrock band Christian Death) in his next band, Shadow Project, during the 1990s.

Eva O also played in Christian Death in the early 1980s and is currently the vocalist for Christian Death 1334, a touring and recording version of Christian Death with the members of the Only Theatre of Pain album.

Emery also played bass with alternative rock band Hole on their 1991 debut album Pretty on the Inside, as well as playing bass in Mazzy Star and Teardrain.

Del Mar Richardson, was a young actor before he entered the music scene. He later went on as session drummer for The Child Molesters Brown Album on "Diary of Madness" and "Espionage," and as session drummer soon after with Rich LaBonte and Kim Fowley, in Los Angeles, CA. He later became an international fashion model and commercial actor. He was in "Do You Remember Love?" with Joanne Woodward (1985), "Who Wants To Be A Hero" starring Ike Eisenmann, and "Lying for A Living" (2002), as himself, in a documentary about the infamous acting course taught by Marlon Brando. He stars in the music video "Busy Being Fabulous" by Eagles (2008) and co-star in "Feel It All" by KT Tunstall (2013). After moving to Europe, he continued his career as a model, commercial actor and theatrical actor in the film Way Down released in November 2020, starring Freddie Highmore, Luis Tosar and Famke Janssen. He continues his work as an actor and radio producer for free-form radio storytelling. 

Darrow went on to play in Hollywood Rose, the pre-Guns N' Roses band that featured Axl Rose and Izzy Stradlin. Before joining Super Heroines, Darrow played in punk trio The Decadents (later changed to 'The Decadent' ) with Jill Emery, from 1978-1982. 

Cathy Falanga disappeared from the LA music scene and re-appeared as Cat Noel at Vermont based radio station WEQX. She would later move to the Capital region of New York and become one half of the "Darwin and Cat" morning show on WZMR, the Edge, in New York. During her stint at The Edge, Noel appeared on ABC Television's Wife Swap as a shock jock who traded lives with a woman who ran a pet crematorium. She returned to Southern California shortly before The Edge became a country station called "The Cat". The Darwin and Cat Radio Show returned in January 2012 as an Internet-based show.

Discography
1981 - Hell Comes to Your House (compilation)
1982 - Cry for Help, Bemisbrain Records
1983 - Souls that Save
1993 - Love and Pain
1995 - Gothic Rock Volume 2: 80's Into 90's
2006 - Anthology

References

External links
[ Allmusic]

All-female punk bands
American death rock groups
American gothic rock groups